Delia Ducoing, better known as Delia Ducoing de Arrate or Isabel Morel (1885-?), was a Chilean writer, journalist, editor and feminist activist. She was best known for her work on behalf of women's rights in the political, social and civil sphere in Chile since 1914. On October 26, 1927, she founded the Women's Union of Chile in the city of Valparaíso with Gabriela Mandujano and Aurora Argomedo, assuming its presidency on May 6, 1928. As a writer, one of her best known works is the book Charlas femeninas (1930), one of the first publications which systematized feminist thought in Chile. She also wrote and edited the magazine Nosotras in the early 1930s.

Selected works 
 Charlas Femeninas (1930)
 El libertador del Hada de Plata (1943)

References

1885 births
Year of death missing
Chilean women writers
Chilean women journalists
Chilean editors
Chilean feminists
Chilean activists
Chilean women activists
Chilean women editors